Brazilian singer Anitta has released five studio albums, one live album, two extended plays, 47 singles (as main artist) and 66 music videos. Anitta was discovered by music producer DJ Batutinha via YouTube in 2010. She eventually signed a record deal with Warner Music Brazil in 2013 and released her debut album, Anitta, that same year, which reached number one and was certified as a gold album in Brazil. Her debut album also produced four singles, including the commercially successful hits "Show das Poderosas" and "Zen".

Ritmo Perfeito (2014) is Anitta's second studio album, which peaked at number two in Brazil and featured five singles, including "Blá Blá Blá", "Na Batida" and "Ritmo Perfeito". In 2015, Anitta released her third studio album, Bang!, which became her best-selling album to date, selling over 300,000 copies in Brazil.

In 2016, Anitta began expanding her success to Latin America. That year, she was featured in a remix of J Balvin's hit single "Ginza" and also released "Sim ou Não", a duet with Colombian singer Maluma. Anitta was later featured on Australian rapper Iggy Azalea's single "Switch" and on Major Lazer's "Sua Cara" which also features Pabllo Vittar in 2017. That same year, she released "Paradinha", her first solo single in Spanish. A series of non-album collaboration singles, such as "Is That For Me" with Swedish producer Alesso, "Downtown" with J Balvin and "Vai Malandra" with MC Zaac, DJ Yuri Martins, the duo Tropkillaz and the American rapper Maejor, followed later in 2017. Kisses (2019) became Anitta's fourth studio album, which received critical acclaim and was nominated for a Latin Grammy Award for Best Urban Music Album. Also in 2019, Anitta was featured in a number of songs released by artists such as Madonna, DJ Snake, Sean Paul, Snoop Dogg, Ozuna, Natti Natasha, Sofia Reyes and Rita Ora.

Later in 2020, Anitta announced her fifth studio album, Versions of Me, and released its lead single "Me Gusta", which features Cardi B and Myke Towers, and became Anitta's first entry on the Billboard Hot 100 chart. "Girl from Rio and "Faking Love" featuring Saweetie followed as the album's next singles in 2021, both charting on the US Billboard Mainstream Top 40 Airplay chart. Later that year, Anitta released the album's fourth single "Envolver", which achieved international charts success, giving Anitta's highest entries on the Billboard Global 200 and Billboard Global Excl. U.S., at numbers five and two, respectively, and broke a string of records, including the Spotify record for most streamed song in a single-day in 2022 (7.278 million), biggest streaming day for a female Latin song, as well as the first song by a Brazilian artist and first solo Latin song to reach the top of the Spotify Global Daily chart. It also broke the record for most one-day streams in Brazil with over 4.5 million plays, a record that was previously held by herself with her 2017 single "Vai Malandra".

Anitta sold over 10 million records in Brazil (certified singles and albums, including features), being one of the most successful female singers in the country.

Albums

Studio albums

Live albums

Extended plays

Singles

As lead artist

As featured artist

Promotional singles

Other charted and certified songs

Guest appearances

Music videos

Notes

References

Discography
Discographies of Brazilian artists
Pop music discographies
Latin pop music discographies